The Association of Independent Tour Operators (AITO), operating as AITO – The Specialist Travel Association, is a British-based travel industry trade group established in 1976 that represents around 120 specialist and independent tour operators . Members of AITO operate in over 170 countries including the UK, with activities spanning a range of interests including adventure, city break, culture, fly drive, luxury, safaris and sports.

The AITO also influences policy that affects consumers and travel industry; particularly initiatives related to independent tour operators.

The current headquarters of the AITO are based in Twickenham, south-west London.

Membership 
AITO members offer full protection of consumer holiday funds, a wide range of specialist holidays, quality customer service and a sustainable approach to travel. There are around 120 Tour Operator members, but around 500 members within the association including AITO Agents, AITO Affiliate Tourist Offices and AITO Affiliate Business Partners.

To become a member, AITO tour operators must have full consumer protection in place. Through this requirement, its quality charter and promotion of sustainable tourism initiatives, AITO upholds high standards within the travel industry.

Quality Charter 
As a requirement for membership, AITO Tour Operators must follow AITO's "Quality Charter". It covers the following measures of quality:
 Exclusive membership criteria
 Financially secure holidays
 Accurate brochures and web sites
 Professional service and continual improvements
 Monitoring standards
 Sustainable tourism
 Fair customer relations

Sustainable tourism 
AITO has led several sustainable tourism (ST) initiatives in the past, notably a ST Star accreditation scheme which ceased in 2013. In 2016 it revisited its Sustainable Tourism values and launched Project PROTECT. Standing for People, Resources, Outreach, Tourism, Environment, Conservation and Tomorrow. Project PROTECT is designed to protect the destinations members operate in. Each member of the association is required to make a pledge, which is reported at the end of the year. The 5-year programme was designed in partnership with the University of Surrey and Sustainable Tourism thought leader Professor Xavier Font. Progress and measurable change will be monitored by AITO HQ, AITO Council, Prof Xavier Font and a PHD student from the University of Surrey.

AITO Awards 
In February 2016, AITO launched its Gold, Silver and Bronze, Tour Operator of the Year Awards, awarded annually to those tour operators with the highest ratings on AITO's website. AITO also presents a series of travel writing awards annually, such as Travel Writer of the Year and Young Travel Writer of the Year. The award winners are published at AITO Awards.

40th Anniversary 
On Tuesday 23 February 2016, AITO celebrated its 40th anniversary at a special dinner at the Royal Horseguards Hotel in London. The special guest for the evening, Simon Reeve, the British author, television presenter and explorer gave the keynote speech and presented the annual awards.

References 

Traveling business organizations
Trade associations based in the United Kingdom
1976 establishments in the United Kingdom
Organizations established in 1976
Organisations based in the London Borough of Richmond upon Thames
Twickenham